Grupa may refer to:

 Grupa, Kuyavian-Pomeranian Voivodeship, village in the administrative district of Gmina Dragacz, within Świecie County, Kuyavian-Pomeranian Voivodeship, in north-central Poland
 Grupa-Osiedle,village in the administrative district of Gmina Dragacz, within Świecie County, Kuyavian-Pomeranian Voivodeship, in north-central Poland